Michael Joseph Hennessy was an Irish politician and businessman. He was first elected to Dáil Éireann as a Businessmen's Party Teachta Dála (TD) for Cork East and North East at the 1922 general election. He was elected as a Cumann na nGaedheal TD for Cork East at the 1923, June 1927 and September 1927 general elections. He lost his seat at the 1932 general election.

Hennessy lived at 11 Rahilly Street, Cobh (formerly King Street). In June 1922 the Bishop of Cloyne Robert Browne, contributed £20 each to the election funds of Hennessy and John Dinneen, Commercial and Farmer pro-Treaty candidates respectively for the Cork East and North East constituency.

References

Year of birth missing
Year of death missing
Cumann na nGaedheal TDs
Members of the 3rd Dáil
Members of the 4th Dáil
Members of the 5th Dáil
Members of the 6th Dáil
Politicians from County Cork
Business and Professional Group TDs
People of the Irish Civil War (Pro-Treaty side)